Two Riders of the Storm is a 1965 novel by the French writer Jean Giono. An English translation by Alan Brown was published in 1967. The book was the basis for the 1984 film Les Cavaliers de l'orage, directed by Gérard Vergez. The film received the award for Best Music and was nominated for Best Set Design at the 10th César Awards.

References

1965 French novels
French novels adapted into films
French-language novels
Novels by Jean Giono